The following highways are numbered 170:

Canada
 New Brunswick Route 170
 Prince Edward Island Route 170
 Quebec Route 170

Costa Rica
 National Route 170

Japan
 Japan National Route 170

United States
 Interstate 170 (Missouri)
 Interstate 170 (Maryland) (former)
 U.S. Route 170 (former)
 Alabama State Route 170
 Arizona State Route 170 (former)
 Arkansas Highway 170
 California State Route 170
 Colorado State Highway 170
 Georgia State Route 170 (former)
 Illinois Route 170
 K-170 (Kansas highway)
 Kentucky Route 170
 Louisiana Highway 170
 Maine State Route 170
 Maryland Route 170
 M-170 (Michigan highway) (former)
 Nevada State Route 170
 New Jersey Route 170 (former)
 New Mexico State Road 170
 New York State Route 170
 New York State Route 170A
 Ohio State Route 170
 Pennsylvania Route 170
 South Carolina Highway 170
 Tennessee State Route 170
 Texas State Highway 170
 Texas State Highway Loop 170
 Farm to Market Road 170
 Utah State Route 170 (former)
 Virginia State Route 170
 Washington State Route 170
 Wisconsin Highway 170
 Wyoming Highway 170
Territories
 Puerto Rico Highway 170